Regan Teresa MacNeil (born April 7, 1959) is a fictional character from William Peter Blatty's horror novel and film adaptation The Exorcist as a supporting character and its first sequel, Exorcist II: The Heretic, and the sequel television series The Exorcist as one of the main protagonists in season one. She was portrayed by Linda Blair in both films and by Geena Davis in the television series.

Character
Regan MacNeil is a 12-year-old girl and the daughter of actress Chris MacNeil (Ellen Burstyn). Regan is caught between her mother's grueling working schedule and the fact that her parents are in the process of an acrimonious divorce (her father is in Europe and is not seen in the movie).  She is named for the character of the same name in William Shakespeare's King Lear.

She is described as shy, even diffident, and it is not within her nature to behave aggressively. She is devoted to her mother, making clay animals as gifts for her and leaving a rose at her place at the kitchen table each morning. Chris is determined to be a good mother, spending all her off days with her. Because she is an atheist, she does not teach Regan about religion, although Chris' secretary Sharon Spencer (Kitty Winn) teaches Regan about the general ideas of Christianity without Chris' approval.

Even though Chris knows Regan very well, it takes her some time to realize that Regan's bizarre changes are not neurological. As soon as she accepts the idea of possession, she consults Fr. Damien Karras (Jason Miller) and begs him to evaluate Regan for an exorcism. While Karras is initially skeptical, he slowly becomes convinced that she is indeed possessed by the ancient demon Pazuzu, and eventually calls for an exorcism.

Karras and Father Lankester Merrin ((Max Von Sydow) perform an exorcism and succeed in exorcising Pazuzu, albeit at the cost of their own lives. Regan retains no memory of her possession. Shortly afterwards, Chris and Regan decide to move. On the day of the move, Father Dyer (William O'Malley) visits their home and, upon seeing his clerical collar, Regan embraces him, implying she has not totally lost her memory.

In the sequel Exorcist II: The Heretic, which takes place four years after the events in The Exorcist, Regan is 16 years old, living in New York City and undergoing psychiatric therapy, claiming to remember nothing about her plight in Washington, D.C. while her psychiatrist believes her memories are only buried or repressed. As the story progresses, Regan is revealed to have psychic healing powers (the reason why the demon attacked her previously).

For The Exorcist III, Carolco Pictures had the idea of a grown up Regan who gives birth to possessed twins but it was abandoned and the story was switched to Blatty's novel Legion instead. John Carpenter was asked to direct The Exorcist III, but backed out when he realized William Peter Blatty really wanted to direct himself and because of creative differences.

Regan MacNeil appears in the television series The Exorcist. As an adult she changed her name to Angela Rance to escape the demons, but they find her again and attack her family, possessing her younger daughter Casey; she makes a deal with Pazuzu to allow him to possess her once again in order to save Casey's life. While possessing her, Pazuzu murders her mother Chris. Regan, with the help of the priests Tomas Ortega and Marcus Keane, finds the strength to once again exorcise the demon from her body and soul, but he retaliates by breaking her back, rendering her paralyzed but still alive.

In December 2020, a reboot of The Exorcist was announced to be in the works from Blumhouse Productions. In July 2021, a trilogy of direct sequels to the original film were confirmed to be in development. Ellen Burstyn was to reprise her role as Chris MacNeil, but Linda Blair wrote on Twitter that she had not been contacted to reprise her role of Regan MacNeil: "As of now, there has not been any discussions about me participating or reprising my role. I wish all those involved the best and I appreciate the loyalty and passion the fans have for The Exorcist and my character."

Casting (film)

Actress/comedian April Winchell states that she was seriously considered for the role until she developed pyelonephritis, which caused her to be hospitalized and ultimately taken out of consideration. Pamelyn Ferdin was a candidate for the role, but the producers may have felt she was too well-known. Denise Nickerson was also considered and offered the role, but her parents rejected it on her behalf after reading the film's script.

Casting (television)
An adult Regan MacNeil appears in the television series The Exorcist portrayed by Geena Davis.

In popular culture
In the Supernatural season 2 episode "The Usual Suspects", Linda Blair guest stars as a police detective helping them against an apparent vengeful spirit. At the end of the episode, Dean Winchester comments that Linda's character looks familiar as he suddenly craves pea soup.

In the flash game The Maze (also known as The Scary Maze Game) by developer Jeremy Winterrowd, an image of Regan's possessed face is used as a screamer in the final level.

In the 2001 comedy horror film, Scary Movie 2, Regan and Pazuzu's characters are parodied in the prologue of the film in a satirical exorcism done by a parody of Father Karras and Father Merrin, portrayed by Andy Richter and James Woods, respectively.

References
Notes

Citations

The Exorcist characters
Fictional characters based on real people
Fictional characters from Washington, D.C.
Fictional characters from New York City
Fictional avatars
Fictional characters with paraplegia
Fictional victims of child sexual abuse
Literary characters introduced in 1971
Characters in American novels of the 20th century
Drama television characters
Female horror film characters
Horror television characters
Child characters in film
Teenage characters in film